General elections were held in Costa Rica on 3 February 2002. For the first time in the country's history, no candidate in the presidential election passed the 40% threshold. This meant a second round of voting had to be held on 7 April which saw Abel Pacheco of the Social Christian Unity Party defeat the National Liberation Party's Rolando Araya Monge.

Many analysts consider this election the beginning of the end of Costa Rica's decades-long two party system. For the first time in many years alternative political forces become really relevant in the Parliament and the plenary had three large party groups; PUSC (19), PLN (17) and PAC (14).

While PUSC won the presidential election and the majority in Congress, PLN became the primal opposition force in Parliament. Centre-left PAC with a progressive proposal seem to had gravely affected traditional third forces at the left of the spectrum like Democratic Force that fail to win any seat on that election even when for some years was Costa Rica's main third party. Right-wing Libertarian Movement also increases its representation from one to six deputies while conservative Costa Rican Renewal Party won one seat as usual.

It was the first time in Costa Rica an evangelical Christian party, the Christian National Alliance, nominated a catholic, biologist and professor Marvin Calvo Montoya, as its presidential candidate. It was also the last presidential election of the Christian National Alliance.

Despite the close contest, voter turnout was only 68.8% on 3 February the lowest since the 1958 elections. For the second round of the presidential elections it fell to 60.2%, the lowest since 1949.

Background
Before the election, the country's Supreme Electoral Tribinal attempted to make several reforms to the electoral system. These included allowing independents to run in local elections, using electronic voting machines, allowing Costa Ricans living abroad to vote, and allowing voters to choose the top two places on parliamentary lists. However, the changes were rejected by the Legislative Assembly, which noted that independent candidature was incompatible with the constitution, and that electronic voting could not be guaranteed to be secure or transparent.

Results

President

By province
First round

Second round

Parliament

By province

Municipal Councils

The elections of municipal councilors of Costa Rica in 2002 were an electoral process held in parallel with the presidential and legislative elections. In them the 495 tenure aldermen and the 495 alternates that conform the 81 Municipal Councils were chosen.

The Central Canton of San José, the most populous, named 13 aldermen. Desamparados and Alajuela named 11. Others less populated (Puntarenas, Limón, Pococí, Heredia, Cartago, La Unión, San Carlos, Goicoechea, Pérez Zeledón, etc.) named 9. Others even smaller (Tibás, Grecia, Vázquez de Coronado, Montes de Oca, Siquirres, Escazú, Turrialba, etc.) appointed 7 council members. Finally, the smallest (Turrubares, San Mateo, Santa Ana, Mora, Montes de Oro, Talamanca, etc.) named 5.

References

Costa Rica
2002 in Costa Rica
Elections in Costa Rica